The men's Greco-Roman 96 kilograms was a competition at the 2013 World Wrestling Championships, held at the László Papp Budapest Sports Arena in Budapest, Hungary, on 21 September 2013.

Results
Legend
C — Won by 3 cautions given to the opponent
F — Won by fall

Finals

Top half

Section 1

Section 2

Bottom half

Section 3

Section 4

Repechage

References
Results Book, Pages 146–147

Men's Greco-Roman 96 kg